Saheed Nurul Islam Mahavidyalaya is an undergraduate college, located at Gokulpur-Harishpur near Basirhat in North 24 Parganas district in the state of West Bengal, India. It was established in 2001. The college is run by the state government, though it is not fully a governmental college. The college is affiliated with West Bengal State University though in its early stages it was affiliated with University of Calcutta. This college offers education to 10+2 or equivalent level students from all over India. It also offers education to students in the sciences and arts and students may take the honours stream. But the college has facility about Studies more.

History

In December 2000, chairman Mustafa Bin Kasem and a group of 107 held a committee and they nomenclatured in the name of martyr Nurul Islam who was a boy-martyr in the late 1970s. At first it faced financial problems. Gradually with the help of some supporters of education, the college reached a suitable stage and on 14 August 2001 it started its new academic year for 2001–02. On 1 July 2003 principal Dr. Anowar Hossain attended for permanent here. In the presence of Honourable Higher Education Minister of the Left front Government Sri Satya Sadhan Chakraborty of West Bengal, the erection of the building was started on 8 March 8, 2001 around 3 p.m. and a few days later the government of West Bengal approved it under University of Calcutta. Several notable educationists and local persons helped to establish the college. Its academic season started in the nearby high school before the buildings were complete; thereafter in 2001 it started in its own classrooms.

Course details
The college offers both arts and science subjects in honours and general courses, which are as follows:

Arts (honours and general)
Bengali
English
History
Philosophy
Education
P.Science
Geography
Arabic
Sanskrit

Science (general)
Mathematics
Physics
Chemistry
Food and Nutrition
Anthropology

Facilities
The college's facilities in arts and science are:
Library
Laboratories
Classrooms
Internet access
Students' health home
Students' aid fund
Sports
Gymnasium

See also
Education in India
List of colleges in West Bengal
Education in West Bengal

References

External links
Official site

Educational institutions established in 2001
2001 establishments in West Bengal